Nikolay Aleksandrovich Zolotov (born 11 November 1994) is a Belarusian professional footballer who plays as a defender for Ukrainian Premier League club Kolos Kovalivka, and the Belarus national team.

Club career
On 23 December 2019, Zolotov signed a long-term contract with Russian Premier League club FC Ural Yekaterinburg. On 18 January 2021, his Ural contract was terminated by mutual consent.

On 14 April 2022, Zolotov joined Bastia on loan until the end of the season.

References

External links
 
 
 

Living people
1994 births
Sportspeople from Vitebsk
Belarusian footballers
Association football defenders
Belarus under-21 international footballers
Belarus international footballers
FC Shakhtyor Soligorsk players
FC Vitebsk players
FC Ural Yekaterinburg players
FC Kolos Kovalivka players
SC Bastia players
Russian Premier League players
Ukrainian Premier League players
Ligue 2 players
Belarusian expatriate footballers
Expatriate footballers in Russia
Belarusian expatriate sportspeople in Russia
Expatriate footballers in Ukraine
Belarusian expatriate sportspeople in Ukraine
Expatriate footballers in France
Belarusian expatriate sportspeople in France